Kuyurgazy (Köyörgäźe) is a rural locality (a village) in Yakshimbetovsky Selsoviet, Kuyurgazinsky District, Bashkortostan, Russia. The population was 189 as of 2010. There are 4 streets.

Geography 
Kuyurgazy is located 34 km southwest of Yermolayevo (the district's administrative centre) by road. Verkhneye Babalarovo is the nearest rural locality.

References 

Rural localities in Kuyurgazinsky District